Fox Sports was a Uruguayan pay television channel specialised on broadcasting sports events. The localised feed was launched on 2 February 2014. The channel used the studios, mobiles and technical equipment of Channel 4 of Montevideo.

In December 2019, it was announced that Fox Sports Uruguay would close after five years due to the acquisition of 21st Century Fox by Disney.

Programming rights

Events and competitions that were seen on Fox Sports Uruguay.

American Football
 National Football League

Australian Rules Football
 Australian Football League

Football 
 Copa Libertadores 
 UEFA Champions League
 UEFA Europa League
 European Supercup
 Bundesliga
 DFL-Supercup 
 FIFA Club World Cup
 Torneos de Verano
 Argentine Primera División

Motorsports 
 Dakar Rally
 Formula One

See also
 Fox Sports International
 Fox Sports Latin America

References 

 http://www.entornointeligente.com/articulo/1996088/URUGUAY-El-primer-relato-de-Julio-Rios-en-Fox-Sports-le-trajo-suerte-a-Nacional-05022014
 https://depor.com/futbol-internacional/alemania/bayern-munich-vs-hertha-berlin-vivo-directo-online-transmision-fox-sports-bein-sports-bundesliga-alemania-robert-lewandowski-live-sports-event-nczd-127962
 https://futbolete.com/futbol-en-vivo/union-berlin-vs-leipzig-en-vivo-online-por-la-bundesliga/

Television channels and stations established in 2014
Latin American cable television networks
Uruguay
Spanish-language television stations
Television in Uruguay
Television channels and stations disestablished in 2019